PFT Commenter (alternatively spelled PFTCommenter or Pro Football Talk Commenter) is a sports media personality portrayed by Eric Sollenberger. Sollenberger, in the persona of PFT Commenter, is a sportswriter who covers the National Football League and US politics for online publication Barstool Sports. He has previously been published on other sports sites including Kissing Suzy Kolber, SBNation, Football Savages, as well as his own site, StrongTakes.com. PFT Commenter, whose name references Profootballtalk.com, is currently the co-host of the Barstool Sports podcast Pardon My Take. He also hosts the podcast, Macrodosing, with former NFL player Arian Foster.

Persona and media appearances
Sollenberger began to use the PFT Commenter alias as a commenter on ProFootballTalk.com before starting the @PFTCommenter Twitter account in 2012, and eventually becoming a contributor for SBNation, Kissing Suzy Kolber and Football Savages.

In September 2015, PFT Commenter made an appearance on Mike Florio's PFT Live radio program. Also in 2015, PFT Commenter began commenting on the 2016 United States presidential election and appeared on camera several times, albeit in the background, during the television coverage of the Republican Party presidential debates. PFT Commenter also asked then-Presidential candidate Ben Carson if he would travel back in time to abort an unborn Adolf Hitler, an exchange covered by the national media, leading to an article headlined "Ben Carson would not abort Baby Hitler" appearing on CNN.com.

PFT Commenter moved to Barstool Sports in March 2016 and started the podcast Pardon My Take along with co-host Dan Katz. The podcast, which is often satirical in nature, has grown to a top ranking on iTunes' "Sports and Recreation" list. In May 2016, PFT Commenter accompanied three other co-workers on a so-called "Grit Week," starting in Buffalo and ending in Indianapolis for the Indianapolis 500. He and Katz also made an appearance on SportsCenter with Scott Van Pelt on February 8, 2017.

Despite the National Football League removing press credentials for Barstool Sports, PFT Commenter sneaked into "Opening Night" for Super Bowl LI in Houston and was able to ask questions to players and coaches.

PFT Commenter makes regular call-in appearances on Bomani Jones' ESPN radio show, The Right Time.

In January 2020, in advance of the XFL's 2020 revival season, PFT Commenter tried-out as a placekicker for the XFL's DC Defenders, after being trained by Jeff Fisher and Morten Andersen, in response to former NFL wide receiver Chad Johnson announcing that he was trying out for the XFL as a kicker (before quickly cancelling). During his tryout, PFT Commenter's signature sunglasses were replaced with tinted goggles and his helmet bore a single bar face mask, which has long been disallowed for use in professional and college football. He was ultimately not selected by the Defenders; instead, Tyler Rausa, who was at the same tryout, won the kicking position.

Identity
Despite his popularity, PFT did not originally publicly reveal his identity. He told Awful Announcing in 2017 that he wore sunglasses on camera to avoid identification and the staff at Barstool Sports referred to him as "PFT", as only half knew his real name. He later said that his identity had become an "open secret" and that it would be found out eventually.

Publishing
As PFT Commenter, Sollenberger wrote the self-published e-book, Goodell vs. Obama: The Battle for the Future of the NFL, which imagines a dystopian future in which President Barack Obama attempts to turn the Dallas Cowboys into a soccer team in Kenya, and NFL commissioner Roger Goodell fights him in a boxing match to stop him.

References

External links

Barstool Sports people
Fictional television personalities
Fictional reporters
Talk show characters
Twitter accounts
National Football League mass media